Johann Luef (21 December 1905 – 3 April 1945) was an Austrian footballer.

References

External links
 Rapid Archiv

1905 births
1945 deaths
Austrian footballers
Austria international footballers
Association football forwards
SK Rapid Wien players
Austrian military personnel killed in World War II